Adina Miles Sash (born Esther Adina Miles) is an American Orthodox Jewish activist and social media influencer. Sash gained notability within Orthodox Judaism for her stage character, FlatbushGirl, on Instagram. Her comedic brand of activism  focuses on the everyday lives of Orthodox Jewish women and their challenges with Jewish Law.

Early life and education 
Sash was raised in Brooklyn, New York. She holds a master's degree in Medieval literature from Brooklyn College. According to Sash, her online activism was born from her having received misogynistic comments, from fellow Orthodox Jews, during an attempt to start a marketing business.

Career

#FrumWomenHaveFaces! 
In 2017, Sash launched a social media campaign #FrumWomenHaveFaces that went viral on social media which raised awareness of the practice of erasing women adopted by some Orthodox newspapers and magazines. Her campaign was covered in the NY Daily News and received the support of actress Mayim Bialik. Sash's campaign tactics included purchasing a full-page ad in the Flatbush Jewish Journal thanking city councilman Chaim Deutsch for his service to the Jewish community, and when informed the paper would not allow her face to be shown or the word "girl" to be used in the title, Sash modified the ad so that an emoji covered her face and her moniker was changed from 'Flatbush Girl' to 'Flatbush Boy'.

Politics 
In 2018, Sash ran for district leader in the 45th New York State Assembly District. In 2019, Sash ran to replace the vacated seat of New York City Councilman Jumaane Williams, but finished in fourth place out of 21 candidates with 696 votes (7.16% of votes cast) after all absentee ballots were counted.

Reception within the Orthodox Jewish community 
Sash's reception within the Orthodox community has been mixed. Backlash to Sash's activism, centering on Orthodox norms of women's modesty, received significant media coverage. Orthodox women's advocacy groups, including the Jewish Orthodox Feminist Alliance (JOFA) and Chochmat Nashim, publicly supported Sash's activism.

Tauriga Sciences 
She currently serves as Chief Marketing Officer of Tauriga Sciences (OTCQB: TAUG), a publicly traded, diversified, life sciences company with a proprietary line of CBD infused products. Tauri-Gum is a subsidiary of Tauriga Sciences, with CBD and CBG infused chewing gum. Channeling her influencer status, Miles-Sash frequently promotes Tauri-Gum products and the related lifestyle via her Instagram account.

See also 
 Meir Kay
 Ayelet the Kosher Komic
 Mendy Pellin

References

External links
 Adina Sash's FlatbushGirl Instagram page
 Adina Sash's YouTube channel

Year of birth missing (living people)
People from Flatbush, Brooklyn
Comedians from New York City
Orthodox Jews and Judaism in New York City
21st-century American politicians
Brooklyn College alumni
American social activists
Living people